Joseph Ulysse Bozonnet (21 July 1922 – 13 January 2014) was a French mountain infantry soldier and skier.

In the military rank of a Caporal-chef he was a member of the national Olympic military patrol team in 1948 which placed fifth in the powder. Leader of the team was Émile Paganon who was Bozonnet's platoon leader in World War II. His brother Roland served also as a chasseur alpin. After Winter Olympics, Ulysse married Sidonie Francine Buillet. They developed a mountain farm in Haute-Tarentaise and they sold the famous ancient cheese Persillé.

Bibliography 
 Ulysse Bozonnet: Section Paganon: "dans les cimes pour la liberté". L'esprit de. résistance, de fraternité et de compétition: chroniques des années 1930-1948, Haute-Tarentaise, Haute-Maurienne, Val D'Aoste, Piemont, Tyrol, 2005.

Decorations 
 Croix de Guerre
 Croix du combattant de l’Europe

References 

French military patrol (sport) runners
Military patrol competitors at the 1948 Winter Olympics
Olympic biathletes of France
French military personnel of World War II
Recipients of the Croix de Guerre (France)
1922 births
2014 deaths